Matthew Mitchell is an American artist whose work has appeared in role-playing games.

Early life and education
Originally from Minnesota, Matthew Mitchell spent a year studying biology/premedical illustration at Iowa State University in Ames. Mitchell then attended the Pratt Institute in Brooklyn and graduated with a Bachelor of Fine Arts. Mitchell collaborated with artist Perre DiCarlo and local community gardeners to build a stone amphitheater in Manhattan's Lower East Side, and then worked as a cabinetmaker and a welder.

Career
Mitchell is known for his work on the Magic: The Gathering card game. His Dungeons & Dragons work includes Book of Exalted Deeds, Epic Level Handbook, and Draconomicon.

He has worked on a series of paintings of American soldiers from Afghanistan and Iraq called "100 Faces of War Experience".

Mitchell is married to Rebecca Guay. They live in Amherst, Massachusetts.

References

External links

21st-century American painters
American male painters
Living people
Painters from Minnesota
Place of birth missing (living people)
Pratt Institute alumni
Role-playing game artists
Year of birth missing (living people)